Nezamysl was the first of the seven Bohemian mythical princes between the (also mythical) founder of the Přemyslid dynasty Přemysl the Ploughman and the first historical prince Bořivoj. The names of the princes were first recorded in Cosmas chronicle and then transmitted into most historical works up into the 19th century, including František Palacký's The History of the Czech Nation in Bohemia and Moravia (1836).

One theory connects the number of princes to the frescoes on the "Ducal Rotunda" of the Virgin Mary and St Catherine in Znojmo, Moravia, which date back to the late 11th or early 12th century. However, Anežka Merhautová suggested that the frescoes depict all the members of the Přemyslid dynasty including the Moravian junior princes at the time when it was painted, rather than a Přemyslid pedigree.

Origin of the name 

Nezamysl's name is thought to be derived from the opposite meaning to Přemysl - "not thinking", cf. Roman "Simplicius". Záviš Kalandra thought the names of the seven princes were cryptical names of ancient Slavonic days of the week - Nezamysl being the first - Sunday when we do not think/intend to work. Another theory says that the names were mistaken from a coherent and partly interrupted old Slavonic text.

Seven mythical princes after Přemysl

In popular culture 
In the game Crusader Kings II, Nezamysl is a playable as the king of Bohemia despite the dubiousness of his existence.

Notes 

Mythical Bohemian princes
Přemyslid dynasty
Fictional Czech people